Dicaeum  is a genus of birds in the flowerpecker family Dicaeidae,  a group of passerines tropical southern Asia and Australasia from India east to the Philippines and south to Australia. The genus Dicaeum is closely related to the genus Prionochilus and forms a monophyletic group.

Its members are very small, stout, often brightly coloured  birds, 10 to 18 cm in length, with short tails, short thick curved bills and tubular tongues. The latter features reflect the importance of nectar in the diet of many species, although berries, spiders and insects are also taken.

2-4 eggs are laid, typically in a purse-like nest suspended from a tree.

Taxonomy
The genus Dicaeum was introduced by the French naturalist Georges Cuvier in 1816. The name is from the Ancient Greek dikaion. Cuvier claimed that this was a word for a very small Indian bird mentioned by the Roman author Claudius Aelianus but the word probably referred instead to the scarab beetle Scarabaeus sacer. The type species was designated as the scarlet-backed flowerpecker by George Robert Gray in 1840.

The genus contains the following species:
 Golden-rumped flowerpecker (Dicaeum annae)
 Thick-billed flowerpecker (Dicaeum agile)
 Striped flowerpecker (Dicaeum aeruginosum)
 Brown-backed flowerpecker (Dicaeum everetti)
 Whiskered flowerpecker (Dicaeum proprium)
 Yellow-vented flowerpecker (Dicaeum chrysorrheum)
 Yellow-bellied flowerpecker (Dicaeum melanozanthum)
 Legge's flowerpecker (Dicaeum vincens)
 Yellow-sided flowerpecker (Dicaeum aureolimbatum)
 Olive-capped flowerpecker (Dicaeum nigrilore)
 Yellow-crowned flowerpecker (Dicaeum anthonyi)
Flame-crowned flowerpecker (Dicaeum kampalili)
 Bicolored flowerpecker (Dicaeum bicolor)
 Red-keeled flowerpecker (Dicaeum australe)
 Black-belted flowerpecker (Dicaeum haematostictum)
 Scarlet-collared flowerpecker (Dicaeum retrocinctum)
 Cebu flowerpecker (Dicaeum quadricolor)
 Orange-bellied flowerpecker (Dicaeum trigonostigma)
 Buzzing flowerpecker (Dicaeum hypoleucum)
 Pale-billed flowerpecker (Dicaeum erythrorhynchos)
 Nilgiri flowerpecker (Dicaeum concolor)
 Plain flowerpecker (Dicaeum minullum)
 Andaman flowerpecker (Dicaeum virescens)
 Pygmy flowerpecker (Dicaeum pygmaeum)
 Crimson-crowned flowerpecker (Dicaeum nehrkorni)
 Buru flowerpecker (Dicaeum erythrothorax)
 Halmahera flowerpecker (Dicaeum schistaceiceps)
 Ashy flowerpecker (Dicaeum vulneratum)
 Olive-crowned flowerpecker (Dicaeum pectorale)
 Red-capped flowerpecker (Dicaeum geelvinkianum)
 Louisiade flowerpecker (Dicaeum nitidum)
 Red-banded flowerpecker (Dicaeum eximium)
 Midget flowerpecker (Dicaeum aeneum)
 Mottled flowerpecker (Dicaeum tristrami)
 Black-fronted flowerpecker (Dicaeum igniferum)
 Blue-cheeked flowerpecker (Dicaeum maugei)
 Mistletoebird (Dicaeum hirundinaceum)
 Grey-sided flowerpecker (Dicaeum celebicum)
 Black-sided flowerpecker (Dicaeum monticolum)
 Fire-breasted flowerpecker (Dicaeum ignipectus)
 Blood-breasted flowerpecker (Dicaeum sanguinolentum)
 Scarlet-backed flowerpecker (Dicaeum cruentatum)
 Scarlet-headed flowerpecker (Dicaeum trochileum)
Spectacled flowerpecker (Dicaeum dayakorum)

References

External links

Flowerpecker videos and photographs

 
Dicaeidae
Bird genera
Taxa named by Georges Cuvier